Cannabis in Vietnam is illegal, but is cultivated within the country and is known as cần sa.

History
Cannabis was probably introduced to Southeast Asia around the 16th century, and used medicinally and in cuisine.

In 1968 the government of the Republic of Vietnam "publicly condemned" the use or trafficking of cannabis, and instructed local chiefs to prevent its cultivation. In 1969, USAID's Office of Public Safety began eradication of cannabis fields, including aerial eradication in the Mekong Delta. The program was popularly resented and also politically unpalatable; in 1971 OPS was advised not to eradicate cannabis in areas controlled by the Hòa Hảo sect, for fear of driving them to join the Việt Cộng (National Liberation Front).

In the 1960s, the United States government became concerned with cannabis use by US troops in Vietnam. Though alcohol was the drug most commonly used by American troops in the Vietnam War, cannabis was the second-most common. Initially rates of usage among deployed soldiers were comparable to those of their stateside peers, with 29% of troops departing Vietnam in 1967 reporting having ever used marijuana in their lives. A 1976 study however showed that from 1967 to 1971, the proportion of troops having used marijuana peaked at 34% before stabilizing to 18%, while the number of troops who had used cannabis prior to deployment stayed around 8%.

References

Vietnam
Drugs in Vietnam